Jatara is a town and a nagar palika parishad in Tikamgarh district in the Indian state of Madhya Pradesh.

Geography
It has an average elevation of 246 metres (807 feet).it is situated near Khajuraho and Orchha.

Demographics
As of the 2001 Census of India, Jatara had a population of 15,593. Males constitute 52% of the population and females 48%. Jatara has an average literacy rate of 57%, lower than the national average of 59.5%: male literacy is 65%, and female literacy is 47%. In Jatara, 18% of the population is under 6 years of age.

References

Cities and towns in Tikamgarh district